Little Revolutions is a 2009 compilation album by Duke Special, collecting 18 rarities, including b-sides, covers and live recordings. It is available on its own or as part of the 5 Nights at the Empire Belfast Box Set.

Track listing
"Ain't Got No" (Live on the Ray D'Arcy Show, Today FM)
"Our Love Goes Deeper (single version)" 
"I Feel for You" 
"Quiet Revolutionaries" 
"I Think I am Losing You"
"Feet in the Sky"
"Deep" (with Emily Loizeau)
"No Cover Up"
"Glimmer Girl"
"Drink to Me only with Thine Eyes"
"Love is Connection"
"Maps" (Live at the Empire Music Hall, Belfast)
"Tainted Love" (with Neil Hannon, live from the Ulster Hall, Belfast)
"Low" (Live at the Empire Music Hall, Belfast)
"Stumble and Fall"
"Lucky" (Nous Radio Session)
"I Know There's an Answer"
"From Clare to Here"

External links
Description page on Duke Special's website

Duke Special albums
2009 compilation albums